Crottet is a commune in the Ain department in eastern France.

Geography
The Veyle forms the commune's southwestern border, then flows into the Saône.

Population

See also
Communes of the Ain department

References

Communes of Ain
Ain communes articles needing translation from French Wikipedia
Bresse